Wainfleet All Saints is an ancient port and market town on the east coast of England, in the East Lindsey district of Lincolnshire,  on the A52 road  south-west of Skegness and  north-east of Boston. It stands on two small rivers, the Steeping and Limb (or Lymn), that form Wainfleet Haven. The town is close to the Lincolnshire Wolds. The village of Wainfleet St Mary is to the south.

History and landmarks

The town stands on or near the former Roman settlement of Vainona. Two tumuli, one to the north and one to the south of the town, are of unknown origin, although it has been suggested that they could be Viking or Roman. A number of coins from the period have been found in the vicinity. In the Domesday Book of 1086, Wainfleet is referred to as 'Wenflet'.

The parish church of All Saints was built in 1820-21 following the demolition of a previous medieval church of the same dedication, using part of the old church's material. A further church, St Thomas, had been destroyed by then. During the demolition of All Saints the tomb of Richard Patten, father of William of Waynflete, was broken up, but it was later restored within Waynflete's Magdalen College Chapel, Oxford.

William of Waynflete founded the town's Magdalen College School in 1484 and obtained for the town a charter of incorporation in 1457. The school building is Grade I listed and houses a museum.

In 1847 Barkham Street, a 'London-style' terrace, was commissioned by Bethlem Hospital and built to the design of Sydney Smirke and to specifications similar to other Bethlem terraces in Southwark, London.

The Market Place has two Grade II listed structures: a clock tower erected in 1899, and a 15th-century limestone Buttercross (set on three steps and topped with a 19th-century finial and weathervane), from which John Wesley preached.

The town is notable for Batemans Brewery; the brewery building incorporates the Georgian Salem House and a former corn mill, Salem Bridge Mill. Public houses in Wainfleet are the Woolpack Hotel and The Angel on High Street. Former pubs included the Jolly Sailor (St Johns Street) and the Royal Oak and the Red Lion (both on High Street and now residential).

Skegness Grammar School has a boarding house in the town on Low Road.

Wainfleet became a conservation area in 1972.

Transport 
Wainfleet railway station is on Station Road, and is on the Nottingham to Skegness Line.

Sport 
Meetings of the Motorcycle Grasstrack Racing are hosted by the Wainfleet & District Sporting Motorcycle Club. They have run annually the International Lincolnshire Poacher race since 1992.
The club have also hosted the British Masters Championship on four occasions in 1997, 1998, 2002, 2004. In 2011 the club hosted the European Grasstrack Championship Final at their home at Thorpe St Peter.

Northolme

At the northern end of Wainfleet All Saints is the hamlet of Northolme, which is all that remains of the lost parish of Wainfleet St Thomas.

No distinction was made between Wainfleet All Saints, Wainfleet St Mary, and Wainfleet St Thomas, until a deed from Peter De Beningword to Bardney Abbey mentions North Wenfled. The original deed held in the British Library is undated, but is estimated to be from the 13th century.

In 1316 Wainfleet St Thomas is mentioned as paying tax under Feudal Aid. At the time of the Reformation, the chapel belonged to Kyme Priory. There is no clear indication of when it was demolished, but it was still standing at the time of the Protectorate, when the general Baptists were granted its use. Nothing remains of the chapel today, although its site is used as an extension of the present cemetery.

In 1546 Thomas Lyttlebury was heir to the manor of Northolme through his brother John. However, it seems that the estate became the property of John's daughter, Alice, who married Thomas Upton. Thomas Upton's successors lived at Northolme Hall.

The first Northolme Hall was an Elizabethan moated manor house, reputedly built in 1549. The present Northolme Hall was built on the same site in 1866.

Population

Geography

Wainfleet is located South of Skegness and North of Boston on the A52.

See also
 RAF Wainfleet - local bombing range.

References

Further reading 
 Ian Simmons, "Medieval and early modern management of the River Lymn and Wainfleet Haven (east Lincolnshire, England)", Landscape History, vol. 39, no. 2 (2018), pp. 5–21. https://doi.org/10.1080/01433768.2018.1534455

External links

 Town web site

 
Towns in Lincolnshire
Civil parishes in Lincolnshire
Buildings and structures in Lincolnshire
Windmills in Lincolnshire
East Lindsey District